Alpine is an unincorporated community and census-designated place (CDP) in Clark County, Arkansas, United States, approximately eight miles east of Amity. The community center located in its heart is a popular draw for Clark County citizens during Christmas, 4th of July and Halloween celebrations annually.

It was first listed as a CDP in the 2020 census with a population of 134.

Demographics

2020 census

Note: the US Census treats Hispanic/Latino as an ethnic category. This table excludes Latinos from the racial categories and assigns them to a separate category. Hispanics/Latinos can be of any race.

Notable person
Alpine was once the childhood home of actor Billy Bob Thornton.

References

External links

Unincorporated communities in Clark County, Arkansas
Unincorporated communities in Arkansas
Census-designated places in Clark County, Arkansas
Census-designated places in Arkansas